Domenico Viglione Borghese (13 July 1877 – 26 October 1957) was an Italian operatic baritone and actor.

Early life
Born in Mondovì, he gave up his studies in medicine to dedicate himself to the study of singing, first in Milan and later with Luigi Leonesi at Conservatorio Rossini in Pesaro, where he was admitted in 1896. He made his début in 1899 at the Teatro Verdi in Lodi as the Herald in Lohengrin. Though he continued working in small, provincial theaters, he soon gave up opera, saying that he did not care "for the atmosphere and intrigues."

America
Shortly thereafter he emigrated to America to join the Klondike Gold Rush but was unsuccessful there. After about three years, he moved to San Francisco, where he worked as a bottle washer, waiter, as a navvy on the railroad, and on the docks. A 1904 San Francisco directory shows him residing at 700 Broadway in San Francisco's Chinatown. He continued taking lessons and singing here and there and by a stroke of fortune was heard by Enrico Caruso, who recommended to the impresario Scognamiglio that he engage Viglione Borghese in his traveling opera troupe, whose prima donna was Luisa Tetrazzini. He sang on their 1906–1906 tour of Mexico, the Caribbean, and South America and from his successes during these performances, he was able to return to Italy at the end of 1906 to pursue an operatic career once more.

Operatic career
His major stage debut was as Amonasro in a 1907 production of Aida at the Teatro Regio in Parma. The power and size of his voice created a sensation, and he soon was alternating Amonasro with Marcello in La bohème and Gerard in Andrea Chénier. About Viglione Borghese's impact on the Italian opera scene, Edgar Herbert-Caesari said:

By 1910 Viglione Borghese had reached La Scala, where he made his début as Nelusko in L'africana and later created the role of Guarca in Spyridon Samaras's Rhea. Thereafter his international career accelerated; he began to sing at many of the major European houses and became a house favorite at the Teatro Colón in Buenos Aires.

In 1911, he created the role of the sheriff Jack Rance in the Italian premiere of Puccini's La fanciulla del West. This was Viglione Borghese's workhorse role for the rest of his career. He had so much success in it that Puccini himself referred to him as "il mio sceriffo."

In 1912 he married Claudia Nappi, daughter of the Milanese music critic of La Perseveranza. In 1917, in Rome, he appeared in the world premiere of Renzo Bianchi's Gismonda alongside Ida Quaiatti and Edoardo Garbin.

He continued singing until age 64, retiring in 1940 with some 70 roles in his repertoire, primarily comprised by Verdi and verismo literature. He lived in Milan, where he taught voice until he died in 1957.

Recordings 
Viglione Borghese’s published recordings were for Fonotipia Records from 1909 to 1910 and for Polydor Records around 1924. Only fairly recently was it discovered that he made two unpublished disc recordings Edison Records in London in 1911. Marston Records issued these on their two volumes of The Edison Legacy: Unpublished Treasures of the Edison Archive.

Actor
Viglione Borghese, convinced by Mario Soldati to try his hand at acting in films, debuted in a small role in that director's Piccolo mondo antico in 1941. Over the next eleven years, Viglione Borghese took on similar modest character roles in another twenty films.

Filmography
 Piccolo mondo antico
 L'amore canta
 Fedora (1942)
 The Son of the Red Corsair (1943)
 Giacomo the Idealist (1943)
 
 L'amico delle donne
 La primadonna
 Piruetas juveniles
 L'abito nero da sposa
 Il ventesimo duca
 Genoveffa di Brabante
 Manù il contrabbandiere
 L'ultima cena
 Giudicatemi!
 The Mill on the Po (1949)
 Heaven Over the Marshes (1949)
 Hand of Death (1949)
 The Mistress of Treves (1952)
 Ho sognato il paradiso
 Il Diavolo in convento
 Mistress of Treves

External links

 Domenico Viglione Borghese biography at Opera Vivrà

References

1877 births
1957 deaths
Italian operatic baritones
Italian male film actors
20th-century Italian male opera singers
19th-century Italian male opera singers
20th-century Italian male actors
People from Mondovì